A Woman's Past is a lost 1915 silent film drama directed by Frank Powell and starring Nance O'Neil. It was based on a play by Captain John King. The film was produced and distributed by the Fox Film Corporation.

Cast
Clifford Bruce - Wilson Stanley
Alfred Hickman - Howard Sterling/Harrison
Carleton Macy - Denton Colt
Nance O'Neil - Jane Hawley

References

External links
 A Woman's Past at IMDb.com

vintage Fox herald(archived)
lobby poster

1915 films
American silent feature films
American black-and-white films
Lost American films
Fox Film films
Films directed by Frank Powell
American films based on plays
Silent American drama films
1915 drama films
1915 lost films
Lost drama films
1910s American films